Rakhmatullo Kayumovich Fuzaylov (born 16 September 1978) is a Tajikistan footballer coach and a former international player. He is the manager of the Tajikistan national under-17 team.

Career

Club
Fuzaylov spent the early part of his career in Tajikistan and Uzbekistan, finishing runner up in the Uzbek League with Neftchi Fargʻona in 1996 and 1997. In 2000 Fuzaylov moved to Russia, signing with Shinnik Yaroslavl. In 2005 Fuzaylov joined Alania Vladikavkaz for a year, before spending a year with Lada-Togliatti and six-months with Nosta Novotroitsk before heading back to Tajikistan for personal reasons. Fuzaylov returned to Russia for a brief spell with Zvezda Irkutsk before again returning to Tajikistan to see out the remainder of his career with Energetik Dushanbe, Vakhsh Qurghonteppa, Regar-TadAZ and CSKA Pamir Dushanbe.

Managerial
In July 2016, Fuzaylov left his position of manager of CSKA Pamir Dushanbe following a poor run of results.

On 20 February 2019, Fuzaylov was announced the new manager of Kuktosh Rudaki.

Career statistics

International

Statistics accurate as of match played 26 June 2010

International goals

Personal life
Fuzaylov's older brother, Khakim Fuzailov, was also a professional footballer.

References

External links
 

1978 births
Living people
Sportspeople from Dushanbe
Tajikistani footballers
Tajikistan international footballers
FC Spartak Vladikavkaz players
CSKA Pamir Dushanbe players
FC Lada-Tolyatti players
FC Shinnik Yaroslavl players
Russian Premier League players
Vakhsh Qurghonteppa players
Buxoro FK players
FK Dinamo Samarqand players
FC Zvezda Irkutsk players
Association football defenders
FC Nosta Novotroitsk players
Tajikistani football managers
CSKA Pamir Dushanbe managers